Playment is an Indian data labeling platform which helps machine learning engineers build high quality ground truth datasets for training and validating machine learning models. It breaks down large problems into micro-tasks and distributes among its large community of trained annotators. It works on the principle of microwork, where a series of small tasks which together comprise a large unified project, and are completed by many people over the Internet.

Annotators can browse through existing tasks and complete them in exchange for points, the points can be further exchanged for vouchers on online e-commerce sites such as Flipkart, Amazon(India) and Paytm.

History 
Playment was founded in August 2015 by Siddharth Mall, Ajinkya Malasane, and Akshay Lal, alumnus of Indian Institute of Technology Kharagapur, Indian Institute of Technology Guwahati and Indian Institute of Technology Kharagapur respectively. They worked at Flipkart.com as Senior Business Analysts, and left to create their new company Playment. On July 2, 2016, Playment run by Crowdflux Technology Pvt Ltd raised $700k Seed capital in funding from SAIF Partners

Services 

Training Data for Machine Learning, Image annotation & Data labeling for Computer Vision, and more.

See also 
 Amazon Mechanical Turk 
 CrowdFlower

References

Further reading 
http://timesofindia.indiatimes.com/venture-capital/SAIF-Partners-invests-Rs-4-7-Cr-in-Playment/articleshow/53022130.cms
https://inc42.com/flash-feed/playment-funding/
http://www.business-standard.com/article/pti-stories/saif-partners-invests-rs-4-7-cr-in-playment-116070200582_1.html
https://techcrunch.com/2017/02/13/playment-gives-companies-on-demand-workers-to-analyze-data-using-mobile-devices/

External links 
 

Crowdsourcing